The Frozen Borderline – 1968–1970 is a two-disc compilation set of music by German musician Nico, released in 2007 by record label Rhino.

Content 

The Frozen Borderline comprises The Marble Index (recorded in 1968, released in 1969) and Desertshore (recorded and released in 1970). The two CDs contain remastered versions of all the tracks from these albums, early/alternate versions of many songs, and two previously unknown tracks.

The last (fourteenth) track of the second CD contains a hidden fifteenth track after ten minutes of silence, which is an alternate version of "Frozen Warnings" (a song from The Marble Index) without the tremulous harmonium, leaving only Nico's vocals and the violins.

Track listing

The Marble Index

Tracks 1 to 8 are remastered versions of the songs from The Marble Index. Track 9 and 10 are two previously unknown songs. Track 11 and 12 are alternate versions of the two bonus tracks from the 1990 CD release of The Marble Index. Track 13 to 19 are early versions of the songs.

 Original album

 Outtakes

 Alternate versions

Desertshore 

Tracks 1 to 8 are remastered versions of the songs from Desertshore. Track 9 to 14 are early versions of the songs. Track 14 contains a hidden 15th track.

 Original album

Demos

Chart performance

References

External links
Lyrics and liner notes
Rhino Records' page about the album

2007 compilation albums
Nico albums
Rhino Records compilation albums